Richard Thomas Guilfoyle (December 22, 1892 – June 10, 1957) was an American prelate of the Roman Catholic Church who served as the third bishop of the Diocese of Altoona, Pennsylvania from 1936 to 1957.

Biography

Early life 
Richard Guilfoyle was born near Punxsutawney, Pennsylvania, on December 22. 1892. At age 15, he started working in a coal mine. After deciding to enter the priesthood, he studied at St. Bonaventure College in St. Bonaventure, New York.

Guilfoyle was ordained to the priesthood for the Diocese of Erie by then Bishop Dennis Joseph Dougherty on June 2, 1917. He then served as a curate at St. Stephen Parish in Oil City until 1921, when he became secretary to then Bishop John Gannon. Guilfoyle also served as pastor of St. Peter's Cathedral in Erie and chancellor of the diocese.

Bishop of Altoona 
On August 8, 1936, Guilfoyle was appointed bishop of  the Diocese of Altoona by Pope Pius XI. He received his episcopal consecration on November 30, 1936, from Archbishop Gannon, assisted by Archbishop Thomas Walsh and Bishop Francis Tief. 

Guilfoyle died of a heart attack in Altoona on June 10, 1957, at age 64. Bishop Guilfoyle High School in Altoona is named after him.

References

1892 births
1957 deaths
St. Bonaventure University alumni
20th-century Roman Catholic bishops in the United States